Moen is a Norwegian toponymic surname.

People with the surname 
Alexandra Moen, English actress
Alf Daniel Moen (born 1950), Norwegian forester and politician for the Labour Party
Alfred M. Moen (1916-2001), American inventor and founder of  Moen Incorporated
Anders Moen (1887-1966), Norwegian gymnast
Anita Moen, (born 1967) Norwegian cross-country skier
Ann-Helen Moen, (born 1969) Norwegian soprano
Arjan Moen (born 1977), Dutch darts player
Arne Vidar Moen (born 1971), Norwegian footballer
Bernt Moen (born 1974), Norwegian musician
Bill Moen (born 1986), American politician
Don Moen, American singer-songwriter, pastor, and producer
Don Moen (Canadian football), Canadian football linebacker
Erika Moen (born 1983), American comics artist
Fritz Moen (1941–2005), Norwegian wrongfully convicted for two distinct felony murders
Frode Moen (born 1969), Norwegian Nordic combined skier
Geir Moen, Norwegian sprinter
Håvard Moen (born 1957), Norwegian footballer
John Moen, American musician
Judi Moen, American talk show host
Lars Magnus Moen  (1885–1964), Norwegian Minister of Education and Church Affairs
Lars Ove Moen, Norwegian race walker
Martine Moen (born 1992), Norwegian handball player
Odd Ivar Moen (born 1955), Norwegian businessman and footballer
Olav Moen (1909-1995), Norwegian politician for the Liberal Party
Ole Moen, Norwegian historian
Øystein Moen (born 1980), Norwegian jazz pianist and composer
Petter Moen (1901–1944), Norwegian resistance member
Petter Vaagan Moen, Norwegian footballer
Rodney C. Moen, American politician
Roger Moen (born 1966), Norwegian racing driver
Søren Berg Sørensen Moen (1899–1946), Norwegian politician for the Labour Party
Sigfrid Persson-Moen, Swedish missionary for the Mission Covenant Church of Sweden in China
Sigurd Moen (1897-1967), Norwegian former speed skater and Olympic medalist
Svein Oddvar Moen, Norwegian football referee
Sverre Moen (1921-1987), Norwegian politician for the Christian Democratic Party
Tim Moen, Canadian politician
Tor-Arne Moen (born 1966), Norwegian painter and writer
Tor Odvar Moen (born 1965), Norwegian handball coach
Travis Moen, Canadian professional ice hockey player
William Moen, American politician

See also

Moe (surname)
Moen (disambiguation)

Norwegian-language surnames
Toponymic surnames
de:Moen
fr:Moen
nl:Moen
no:Moen
ru:Моэн
vi:Moen